Elisabetta Foradori (born 1960s Mezzolombardo), is an Italian winemaker. She is considered a wine ambassador of Trentino.

Life 
Elisabetta Foradori studied agriculture and viticulture at the agricultural institute of San Michele all'Adige.

She took over the family winery located in the Alto Adige region in Italy, following the sudden death of her father in 1976, and interim leadership of her mother. While the region is concentrating on wine industrialization, favoring quantity, moving towards small quality production.

For more than 25 years, she undertook a study of the grape varieties produced on her estate and in particular of the genetic links. She is considered a wine ambassador of Trentino.

Domain 
The Foradori estate, initially founded in 1901, is inspired by the teachings of Rudolf Steiner. The estate is now considered one of the wine paragons of the region thanks to the resurrection of a forgotten grape variety, the teroldego. This policy of revitalizing this grape variety is an integral part her vision, also using two other indigenous grape varieties: Manzoni Bianco, and Nosiola.

The company includes fifteen different plots for a total of 28 hectares. The estate's grape varieties are 75% Teroldego, 15% Manzoni Bianco, 5% Nosiola, and 5% Pinot Gris.

Annual production is on average around 165,000 bottles per year and turnover around two million euros.

Philosophy 
Elisabetta Foradori pursues an agricultural philosophy by developing an agricultural ecosystem including the production diversification and complementarity:, with production of olives, animal breeding, production of dairy products, plants such as wheat.

Foradori believes that certain varieties must be rebuilt and that ancestral methods must be brought back into current viticultural practices. This vision is implemented with autochthonous grape varieties produced on the estate, while the latter offer lower yields than the grape varieties selected in industrial viticulture for the importance of the yields. The estate proceeds to the implementation of a mass selection, that is to say that the new vines are grafts from the vines. Wine is fermented in Spanish clay amphorae.

The estate invests in the development of a living ecosystem to enrich the forms of life around the vines and thus imposes itself in the line of estates worked in biodynamic agriculture. The latter has been certified since 2009.

References

External links 

 WINES OF THE DOLOMITES FROM FORADORI Louis/Dressner Selections

Italian winemakers
1960s births
Living people